Line 13 of the Shenzhen Metro is one of the four new metro lines of the metro's Phase IV expansion under construction in the city of Shenzhen, Guangdong. It is expected to be completed and operational in 2023.

Stations

References

Shenzhen Metro lines
Transport infrastructure under construction in China